"The Ballad of Cassandra Southwick" is a poem written by American Quaker poet John Greenleaf Whittier in 1843.  It details the religious persecution of Cassandra Southwick's youngest daughter Provided Southwick, a Quaker woman who lived in Salem, Massachusetts and is the only white female known to be put up at auction as a slave in the United States.

History

The ballad's foundation is based on a remarkable event in the history of Puritan intolerance in early colonial America.  In 1659, the youngest son and daughter of Lawrence and Cassandra Southwick, who themselves were imprisoned, deprived of all property and ultimately banished from Massachusetts Bay Colony, were fined £10 each for non-attendance at church, which they were unable to pay due to the severity of the family's legal and financial hardships.  The case of Daniel and Provided Southwick was presented to the General Court at Boston, which issued an order signed by Edward Rawson empowering the treasurer of Essex County "to sell the said persons to any of the English nation at Virginia or Barbadoes [sic] to answer said fines."  An attempt was made to sell Daniel and Provided at auction, but none of the shipmasters present were willing to take them to the West Indies.

Characterizations
Whittier characterized Massachusetts Governor John Endecott as "dark and haughty" and exhibiting "bitter hate and scorn" for the Quakers.  Secretary Rawson is characterized as Endecott's willing minion.

References

Poetry and hymns by John Greenleaf Whittier
1843 poems
English-language poems
Historical poems
Southwick